Murtenica (Serbian Cyrillic: Муртеница) is a mountain in western Serbia, forming the southern part of Zlatibor highland. It lies near the towns of Čajetina and Nova Varoš. Its highest peak Brijač has an elevation of 1,480 meters.

References

Mountains of Serbia